Abortion in Hinduism, while generally sinful by traditional Hindu scriptures, can be interpreted equivocally within the vast spectrum of Hindu beliefs and texts. The Mahanarayana Upanishad lists abortion with actions such as breaking one's vow of chastity. Hindu scriptures teach that "abortion a worse sin than killing one's parents" and "another text says that a woman who aborts her child will lose her caste". In general, Hinduism teaches the guiding principle of Ahimsa, abstention from causing harm or injury to all living beings, which serves as the root of the ethic of non-violence.

However, Hindu texts such as the Mahabharata, the Bhagavad Gita and the Ramayana, as well as scholars disagree about what the principles of Ahimsa dictate when one is faced with situations that require self-defense. Just as some Hindu texts on Ahimsa praise meat consumption while others suggest a taboo on meat-eating, the precept of "non-injury" has a dynamic meaning throughout the history of Hindu philosophy and text.

Hindu texts such as the Bhagavad Gita argue that the soul is neither born, nor does it die; so-called "sin" cannot touch those who dedicate their actions to duty and devotion to Brahma (thus seated in the Absolute Truth), like a lotus leaf is untouched by water.

Interpretations based on Hindu Texts

The Concept of the Soul 
According to an article on September 1, 1985 on the Hinduism Today website, "Several Hindu institutions have shared their positions on abortion recently. The Brahma Kumaris World Spiritual University does not take a formal unchanging political or religious stance on the issue of abortion. According to Vedic literature an eternal individual soul inhabits the body of every living creature...The soul enters the womb at the time of conception, and this makes the fetus a living, individual person."
The Bhagavad Gita states that the soul is neither born, nor does it die. The Bhagavata Purana goes further to state that Jīva (soul) is eternal and as such is unrelated to his body, not subject to decay or change and thus dispassionate. Some Hindu theologians believe personhood begins at 3 months and develops through to 5 months of gestation, possibly implying permitting abortion up to the third month and considering any abortion past the third month to be destruction of the soul's current incarnate body.

Discourse in Texts 
Hindus go as far as to make clear distinctions in their sacred texts between abortions and miscarriages. The text goes as far as stating that killing a male embryo who could have been a Brahmin is the same as killing an adult Brahmin which is considered one of the worst sins one can commit. This, again, reiterates the importance of producing offspring that serve a particular societal role, which may be of dubious concern in modern society. The Bhagavad Gita also includes lamentation of the degradation of a dynasty or society through "undesirable progeny" which has been interpreted by some to mean a lack of descendants qualified to perform propitiatory rites.

The primary discourse of the Bhagavad Gita is Arjuna's predicament of whether it is permissible to kill his own kin and Guru. Here, Sri Krishna makes the argument that it is more important to perform righteous deeds based on informed virtues, free from attachment or emotion.  So-called "sin" cannot touch those who dedicate their actions to duty and their devotion to Brahma (thus being seated in the Absolute Truth), like a lotus leaf is untouched by water. The teachings of the Bhagavad Gita encourage informing the morality of an action with following the righteous path or duty of an individual, which in the case of abortion includes self-defense and least harm, and may or may not include maternal choice.

Current statistics 
Individual Hindus hold varying stances on abortion. For this reason, it has become common to not state the Hindu view on abortion, but rather one Hindu's view on abortion. Even with a high rate of abortion in India, statistics showed 80 per cent of Indian women disapproved and 56 per cent consider it a heinous crime, (which does not separate by religious identification).  One of the social reasons for a massive number of abortions in India likely includes the gender of the fetus. The 2011 census showed 7.1 million fewer girls than boys aged younger than seven, which showed an increase compared to the 6 million in 2001 and 4.2 million in 1991. In the United States where the discourse surrounding abortion is in large part framed by Christian groups, 68% of Hindus surveyed believe abortion should be legal in all/most cases while 29% believe abortion should be illegal in all/most cases.

Amount of suffering
If the mother's life is at risk, Hinduism permits abortion. The general value system of Hinduism teaches that the correct course of action in any given situation is the one that causes the least harm to those involved. Thus in the case where the mother's life is at risk, abortion is considered acceptable.

Popular Misinterpretations 
Several sources use the following quotes from Hindu texts regarding the morality of abortion:

Bhagavad Gita, 2.13 "Just as the embodied soul continuously passes from childhood to youth to old age, similarly, at the time of death, the soul passes into another body. The wise are not deluded by this."

This quote from the Bhagavad Gita describes the process of reincarnation, without any particular judgement on the act of abortion.

Bhagavata Purana, 6.16.14 "Queen Kṛtyadyuti’s co-wives, who had poisoned the child, were very much ashamed, and they lost all their bodily luster. While lamenting, O King, they remembered the instructions of Aṅgirā and gave up their ambition to bear children. Following the directions of the brāhmaṇas, they went to the bank of the Yamunā, where they bathed and atoned for their sinful activities."

This quote is taken from a story regarding Citraketu, the King of Śūrasena. He had bore no male children until meeting the great sage Aṅgirā who blessed the King's first wife, Kṛtadyuti, that she then gave birth to a son. However, her co-wives were envious and committed infanticide - thus, this parable concerns the act of infanticide rather than abortion. Infanticide also features in several Hindu epics such as within the Mahabharata in the story of Ganga and Shantanu.

References

Religion and abortion
Abortion in India
Abortion